Watter is an American experimental music ensemble from Louisville, Kentucky.

Watter member Zak Riles is a member of Grails, and Britt Walford formerly drummed in the band Slint. Their debut, This World, features appearances from Rachel Grimes of Rachel's, Todd Cook of The For Carnation and The Shipping News, and Tony Levin of King Crimson.

Members
Zak Riles - guitar, keyboards
Tyler Trotter - keyboards
Britt Walford - percussion

Discography
This World (Temporary Residence, 2014)
History of the Future (Temporary Residence, 2017)

References

External links
 

Musical groups from Louisville, Kentucky
American experimental musical groups
American post-rock groups
2013 establishments in Kentucky
Musical groups established in 2013
Temporary Residence Limited artists